Rirette Maîtrejean was the pseudonym of Anna Estorges (born 14 August 1887; died 11 June 1968). She was a French individualist anarchist born in Tulle who collaborated in the French individualist anarchism magazine L'Anarchie along with Émile Armand and Albert Libertad. She converted to anarchism at the age of 17. While participating in the journal she gave talks on anarcha-feminist and free love subjects. Along with Serge she went on trial in 1912 accused of participating in the illegalist organization Bonnot Gang.

Personal life
Maîtrejean had romantic relationships with Maurice Van Damme and later Victor Serge. She gave birth to two children before marrying Louise Maîtrejean in 1906, whom she later left to be with Vandamme.

External links

 Maîtrejean archive at RevoltLib.com
 Maîtrejean archive at TheAnarchistLibrary.org

References

1887 births
1968 deaths
Anarcha-feminists
Free love advocates
French anarchists
Illegalists
Individualist anarchists
People from Tulle